Cunninghame North can refer to:

 Cunninghame North (UK Parliament constituency)
 Cunninghame North (Scottish Parliament constituency)